The 1939 Langston Lions football team was an American football team that represented Langston College as a member of the Southwestern Athletic Conference during the 1939 college football season. In their 10th season under head coach Caesar Felton Gayles, the team compiled an overall record of 7–0–1 with mark of 5–0–1 in conference play, won the SWAC championship, shut out four of eight opponents, and outscored all opponents by a total of 83 to 26. The 1939 Langston team was recognized as the  black college national champion.

Schedule

References

Langston
Langston Lions football seasons
Black college football national champions
Southwestern Athletic Conference football champion seasons
College football undefeated seasons
Langston Lions football